Raymond Powell (5 August 1924 – May 2014) was a Welsh professional footballer who played as a centre forward in the Football League for Swansea Town and Scunthorpe & Lindsey United. He played non-league football for Haverfordwest Athletic, Kettering Town, Banbury Spencer and Wellingborough Town, where he was player-manager.

Life and career
Powell was born in 1924 in Morriston, Swansea, and attended Glanmôr School. He was called up to the Royal Air Force during the Second World War, and met his future wife while serving in South Africa. He played both football and rugby during the war for RAF teams and football for Cambridge Town, Morriston and Haverfordwest Athletic. While playing against Swansea Town in 1947, Powell impressed that club's manager enough to take him on as a professional. He scored freely for the reserve side, but played little first-team footballafter his first season, in which he scored four goals from 13 Football League matches, he made just 6 first-team appearances in any competition in three years. In 1951, Powell joined Third Division North club Scunthorpe & Lindsey United. He stayed for only one season, in which he was the club's top scorer with 14 league goals, and then left the professional game. He remained in non-league football, playing part-time for Kettering Town and Banbury Spencer and acting as player-manager of Wellingborough Town, until moving to Romford, Essex, in 1961 and working as company secretary of a security firm. Powell died in Essex in 2014 at the age of 89.

References

1924 births
2014 deaths
Footballers from Swansea
Welsh footballers
Association football forwards
Cambridge City F.C. players
Haverfordwest County A.F.C. players
Swansea City A.F.C. players
Scunthorpe United F.C. players
Kettering Town F.C. players
Banbury United F.C. players
Wellingborough Town F.C. players
English Football League players
Southern Football League players
Welsh football managers
Wellingborough Town F.C. managers
Royal Air Force personnel of World War II